Crispin Mulumba Lukoji (5 March 1943 – 3 March 1997), was a Congolese politician. An academic by profession, he became Prime Minister of Zaire on 1 April 1991 after Lunda Bululu resigned. He was relatively unknown prior to his selection, but was praised for his economic acumen. His appointment was seen as a move to cause opposition leaders Étienne Tshisekedi and Jean Nguza Karl-i-Bond to lose support. Lukoji oversaw the National Conference in August 1991 that led to democratization. He was criticized for being too close to President Mobutu Sese Seko and rapidly lost support by opposition forces. Lukoji was forced to resign on 29 September 1991 amid civil unrest. He died in Johannesburg on 3 March 1997.

References

1943 births
1997 deaths
People from Haut-Katanga Province
Democratic Republic of the Congo economists
Prime Ministers of the Democratic Republic of the Congo
Government ministers of the Democratic Republic of the Congo
20th-century economists
Popular Movement of the Revolution politicians